Estádio Aderbal Ramos da Silva, usually called Estádio da Ressacada or just Ressacada, is a football stadium inaugurated on November 15, 1983 in Carianos neighborhood, Florianópolis, Santa Catarina, with a maximum capacity of approximately 19,000 people. The stadium is owned by Avaí. Its formal name honors Aderbal Ramos da Silva (1911–1985), who was president of the Santa Catarina Football Federation and was also governor of the state.

Several matches of the Brazilian football team, as well as the Brazilian football Olympic team were played at Ressacada stadium.

This stadium should not be confused with Blumenau's former stadium, which was also called Estádio Aderbal Ramos da Silva. However, it was nicknamed DEBA and had a maximum capacity of 4,000 people.

History
In 1982, to replace the old Estádio Adolfo Konder, Avaí bought a ground plot close to the city's airport (Hercílio Luz International Airport). The construction works were led by Cairo Bueno, and the stadium was designed by the architect Davi Ferreira Lima.

The inaugural match was played on November 15, 1983, when Vasco da Gama beat Avaí 6-1. The first goal of the stadium was scored by Vasco da Gama's Wilson Tadei.

On May 31, 1986, the stadium lights were inaugurated.

The stadium's attendance record currently stands at 25,735, set on July 17, 1988, when Avaí beat Blumenau 2-1, for the Campeonato Catarinense final.

Events
The Ex-Beatle Paul McCartney played a concert at the stadium on April 25, 2012, in front of 30,000 fans during his On the Run Tour, this one been his first concert in the city.

References

Enciclopédia do Futebol Brasileiro, Volume 2 - Lance, Rio de Janeiro: Aretê Editorial S/A, 2001.

External links
Templos do Futebol
Avaí's Official website
Estadio da Ressacada no site da Torcida

Ressacada
Sport in Florianópolis
Avaí FC
Sports venues in Santa Catarina (state)